Carl Niclas von Hellens (1 August 1745 – 26 January 1820) was a Finnish botanist.

Life
He was born Carl Niclas Hellenius in Kärkölä and studied at the Royal Academy of Turku from 1764. He studied under Pehr Kalm and Pehr Adrian Gadd. He was named docent in chemistry, zoology and economics in 1773. He went to Uppsala University in 1774 to study medicine and received a doctoral degree in medicine there in 1776. Between 1777 and 1780 he worked as a medical doctor at Serafimerlasarettet, Sweden's first modern hospital, in Stockholm. He subsequently returned to Finland and Turku. He remained active at the academy in the city for the remainder of his life. He was responsible for the botanical garden and increased the number of plants in its collections from a couple of hundred to over two thousand species. He was ennobled in 1816 and took the name von Hellens.

The botanical genus Costus was formerly known as Hellenia after Carl Niclas von Hellens. He died in Turku, aged 74.

References

1745 births
1820 deaths
18th-century Finnish botanists
Finnish expatriates in Sweden
People from Kärkölä
19th-century Finnish botanists